Litoria wapogaensis is a species of frog in the subfamily Pelodryadinae.

Its natural habitat is tropical rainforest with small, slow-flowing streams, its breeding habitat. While the known range is very small, it was reasonably common there. There are no known threats to this species.

References

wapogaensis
Endemic fauna of Indonesia
Amphibians of Western New Guinea
Frogs of Asia
Amphibians described in 2001
Taxonomy articles created by Polbot